The Rotax 914 is a turbo-charged, four-stroke, four-cylinder, horizontally opposed aircraft engine with air-cooled cylinders and water-cooled cylinder heads. It is designed and built by the Austrian company BRP-Powertrain, owned by Bombardier Recreational Products  (BRP), as part of its Rotax brand.

The engine commonly powers certified light aircraft, homebuilt aircraft, autogyros and military UAVs such as the MQ-1 Predator.

Design and development
Introduced in 1996, the Rotax 914 is a turbocharged development of the Rotax 912.

The Rotax 914 has a turbocharger with an automatic wastegate controller and dual carburettors. It features dual capacitor discharge ignition, liquid-cooled cylinder heads and air-cooled cylinder barrels, an electric starter, a built in propeller reduction gearbox, dry sump forced oil lubrication and has a separate oil tank. It has hydraulic valves that include automatic adjustment. Rotax can provide a purpose-designed air intake, exhaust system and engine mount.

The 914 oil system differs from most dry-sump designs in that lubricating oil is forced into the storage tank by crankcase pressure rather than by a separate scavenge pump. This requires a novel preflight inspection procedure: before checking the oil level with the dipstick, the engine is "burped" by removing the oil filler cap and turning the propeller until a gurgling sound is heard, which indicates that all oil has been forced into the tank and the oil level can now be checked accurately.

The 914 is more fuel efficient and lighter than similarly sized traditional engines, but originally had a shorter time between overhaul (TBO), restricting its market potential. On introduction, the TBO was only 600 hours, which was double that of previous Rotax engines but far short of existing engines of comparable size and power. However, by 1999 the TBO had been increased to 1,000 hours, and it was increased again to 2,000 hours in 2010.

The engine can be operated on 100LL leaded avgas or on unleaded regular automotive gasoline, with a minimum RON of 95. If the 914 is operated using leaded fuel, lead sludge will accumulate in the oil tank and reduction gearbox, and the fuel is incompatible with the recommended synthetic oil because it cannot hold lead in suspension; consequently, using leaded fuel mandates additional maintenance, and unleaded fuel is recommended.

Variants
914 F
Family of engine versions certified to US Federal Aviation Administration FAR 33 and EASA JAR-E. These include: 
914 F2: Version equipped to accept a fixed pitch propeller.
914 F3: Version equipped with a hydraulic governor for a constant speed propeller.
914 F4: Version equipped to accept a hydraulic governor for a constant speed propeller.
914 UL
Non-certified engine version for homebuilt and ultralight aircraft.

Applications

Specifications (914)

See also

References

External links

Boxer engines
Rotax engines
1990s aircraft piston engines